Nicholas Northcote (born 5 January 1981) is a South African-born Italian cricketer. He is a right-handed batsman and wicket-keeper. Northcote made his international debut against the Netherlands in 2006 and has represented Italy 26 times.  He played a single first-class appearance prior to playing for Italy, representing Boland against Zimbabwe Under-23s in 2005.

External links
Nicholas Northcote at Cricket Archive 

1981 births
Italian cricketers
Living people
South African emigrants to Italy
Italian sportspeople of African descent
Boland cricketers
South African cricketers